Salvatore Giunta (born 13 April 1967) is an Italian football coach and former player, most recently in charge as manager of Serie B club Brescia.

Playing career 
Giunta is a former central midfielder who played for, among others, A.C. Milan and Albacete Balompié, as well as the Italian under-21 side.

Giunta also played for AS Cannes in French Ligue 2 during the 1998–99 season.

Coaching career 
After retirement, Giunta started as coaching career working for the youth teams of Brescia, a former team of his as a player.

During the 2008–09 season, he then served as head coach of Serie D amateurs Suzzara. He successively started a collaboration with Eugenio Corini, working as his assistant at Portosummaga, Crotone and Frosinone.

In October 2013, Giunta took over from Alessio Tacchinardi as head coach of Lega Pro Seconda Divisione club Pergolettese, and was himself sacked in February 2014.

On 21 January 2015 he was appointed new head coach of Serie B club Brescia, taking over from caretaker Ivan Javorčić. He was sacked less than a month later on 18 February 2015 and replaced by Alessandro Calori.

References 

1967 births
Living people
Italian footballers
Italy under-21 international footballers
Serie A players
Serie B players
Ligue 2 players
Segunda División players
A.C. Milan players
A.S. Sambenedettese players
Brescia Calcio players
Como 1907 players
Hellas Verona F.C. players
AS Cannes players
Albacete Balompié players
Carrarese Calcio players
S.S. Teramo Calcio players
Italian expatriate footballers
Expatriate footballers in France
Italian expatriate sportspeople in France
Expatriate footballers in Spain
Italian expatriate sportspeople in Spain
Association football midfielders